This is a list of people, living or dead, accompanied by verifiable source citations associating them with schizophrenia, either based on their own public statements, or (in the case of dead people only) reported contemporary or posthumous diagnoses of schizophrenia.  Remember that schizophrenia is an illness that varies with severity.

Regarding posthumous diagnoses: only a few famous people are believed to have been affected by schizophrenia. Most of these listed have been diagnosed based on evidence in their own writings and contemporaneous accounts by those who knew them. Also, persons prior to the 20th century may have incomplete or speculative diagnoses of schizophrenia.

Living people 
 Edward Charles Allaway – American murderer; committed California State University, Fullerton massacre in 1976
 Haroon Rashid Aswat – British follower of extremist Islamic cleric Abu Hamza al-Masri; pleaded guilty in U.S. court to providing material support to al-Qaeda
 Nathaniel Ayers – American musician
 Kat Bjelland – American musician, member of Babes in Toyland (schizoaffective disorder)
 Nick Blinko – British painter and punk musician: singer, lyricist and guitarist of Rudimentary Peni (schizoaffective disorder)
 Cesare Cremonini – Italian singer-songwriter, member of Lùnapop
 Will Elliott – Australian writer
 Jim Gordon – American drummer, member of Derek and the Dominos; killed his mother
 Darrell Hammond – American comedian, actor on Saturday Night Live
 Tom Harrell – American jazz trumpeter, flugelhornist, composer, and arranger
 Michael Hawkins – American actor; diagnosed with schizophrenia and bipolar disorder
 Luke Helder – The Midwest Pipe Bomber – schizoaffective disorder
 David Helfgott – Australian concert pianist (schizoaffective disorder)
 John Hinckley Jr. – American failed assassin
 H.R. – American musician, singer of Bad Brains
 Sasha Lane – American actress (schizoaffective disorder)
 Jake Lloyd – retired American actor who played Anakin Skywalker in Star Wars: Episode I – The Phantom Menace
 Jared Lee Loughner – perpetrator of the 2011 Tucson shooting
 Rufus May – British clinical psychologist
 Jeremy Oxley – Australian musician and member of the Sunnyboys
 Elyn Saks – American law professor and schizophrenia writer/researcher
 Mark Vonnegut – American memoirist, pediatrician, son of author Kurt Vonnegut
 Stefan Wilmont - Polish criminal who assassinated the mayor of Gdańsk in 2019
 Brian Wilson – American musician, singer, songwriter, and record producer who co-founded the Beach Boys (schizoaffective disorder)

Deceased 
Jeffrey Arenburg – Canadian shooter of hockey player Brian Smith
Antonin Artaud – French dramatist, poet, essayist, actor, and theatre director, creator of Theatre of Cruelty
Syd Barrett – British musician, founding member of Pink Floyd
Konstantin Batyushkov – Russian poet of the 19th century
Herb Baumeister – American alleged serial killer
Estelle Bennett – American musician, member of The Ronettes
Arthur Bispo do Rosário – Brazilian outsider artist (1909–1989)
Buddy Bolden – American pioneering jazz musician
Clara Bow – American Hollywood flapper actress and "It Girl" of the 1920s
Richard Brautigan – American novelist, poet, and short story writer
Jean "Binta" Breeze (1956–2021), Jamaican dub poet, theatre director, and performer
Camille Claudel – French sculptor of the 19th century
Aloïse Corbaz – Swiss painter
Tivadar Csontváry Kosztka – Hungarian painter
Terry A. Davis – American computer programmer and vlogger 
Princess Deokhye – Last princess of the Korean Empire, diagnosed with precocious dementia, an old name of schizophrenia
John du Pont – American millionaire and wrestling coach who murdered wrestler Dave Schultz
Eduard Einstein – Son of German physicist Albert Einstein
Roky Erickson – American rock musician, founder of The 13th Floor Elevators
Frances Farmer – American Hollywood actress, varyingly diagnosed with schizophrenia, bipolar psychosis, split personality and depression
Pavel Fedotov – Russian painter of the 19th century
Wild Man Fischer – American musician, diagnosed with paranoid schizophrenia and bipolar disorder
Zelda Fitzgerald – American wife of writer F. Scott Fitzgerald; writer, dancer and artist
Janet Frame – New Zealand author
Ed Gein – American killer and body snatcher
Eugène Gabritschevsky – Russian painter and microbiologist
Ted Gärdestad – Swedish musician (was in Eurovision 1979)
Paul Gösch – German artist and architect
Hamad al-Hajji – Saudi Arabian poet 
Donny Hathaway – American soul singer and songwriter
Sigrid Hjertén – Swedish painter
Adèle Hugo – Daughter of French writer Victor Hugo; her story is told in the film The Story of Adele H.
 Daniel Johnston – American artist and musician
Uuno Kailas – Finnish poet
Marij Kogoj – Slovenian composer
Ronald Kray – English gangster prominent during the 1950s and 1960s
Veronica Lake – American Hollywood actress of the 1940s
Jakob Lenz – German writer of the Sturm und Drang movement of the 18th century
Elfriede Lohse-Wächtler – German avantgarde-painter
Agnes Martin – Canadian American abstract painter
Charles Manson – American criminal, cult leader and folk rock musician
Charles Meryon – French artist
William Chester Minor – American killer and a contributor to Oxford English dictionary
Audrey Munson – American artist's model and film actress, "America's First Supermodel"
John Nash – American economist, mathematician and Nobel Prize winner in Economic Sciences
August Natterer – German painter
Émile Nelligan – French Canadian poet
Vaslav Nijinsky – Russian ballet dancer, choreographer
Michael O'Hare – American actor, suffered from paranoid delusions and hallucinations
John Ogdon – English pianist and composer
Ol' Dirty Bastard – American rapper, one of the founding members of the Wu-Tang Clan
Bettie Page – American pin-up model
Robert M. Pirsig – American writer and philosopher
Bud Powell – American jazz pianist
Darren Rainey – American prisoner who died at Dade Correctional Institution after being left in a steaming hot shower for two hours by prison guards
Joey Ramone – lead vocalist of American band Ramones
Katherine Routledge – British archaeologist
Daniel Paul Schreber – German judge, writer, and notable patient of Freud
Ingo Schwichtenberg – German drummer of power metal band Helloween
Vashishtha Narayan Singh – Indian academic
Valerie Solanas – American radical feminist who attempted to murder artist Andy Warhol
Nancy Spungen – American Punk icon and girlfriend of Sex Pistols bassist Sid Vicious
Talal – King of Jordan (for a year)
Kelly Thomas – American citizen who was beaten to death by police without punishment
Gene Tierney – American actress
Lauri Viita – Finnish poet and author
Louis Wain – British artist
Robert Walser – Swiss author, diagnosed with a catatonic schizophrenia
Aby Warburg – German art historian and cultural theorist, diagnosed with schizophrenia and bipolar disorder
Butch Warren – American jazz double bassist
Hannah Weiner – American 'clairvoyant' poet
Karl Maria Wiligut – Austrian SS-general and an occultist
Wesley Willis – American musician and artist
Adolf Wölfli – Swiss painter
Unica Zürn – German artist

See also 
 List of people with bipolar disorder

References

 
Schizophrenia